Heinävesi is a municipality of Finland. It is located in the North Karelia region. Neighbouring municipalities are Savonlinna, Varkaus, Leppävirta, Tuusniemi, Outokumpu and Liperi. The municipality is unilingually Finnish.

In 2021, Heinävesi had its region reassigned from South Savonia to North Karelia.

The only Orthodox Christian monasteries in Finland, the New Valamo Monastery and the Lintula Holy Trinity Convent, are located in Heinävesi.

Notable people
 Tuomas Gerdt, last living Knight of the Mannerheim Cross
 Onni Happonen, politician and murder victim
 Kuikka-Koponen (real name Abel Koponen), illusionist and magician

Gallery

References

External links

Municipality of Heinävesi – Official website

 
1869 establishments in the Russian Empire